The Express-Star, "Grady County's News Source", is a daily newspaper published six days a week in Chickasha, Oklahoma, United States. The publication covers Grady County, Oklahoma. It is published Monday to Friday and a Weekend Edition is delivered on Saturday mornings.

The publication is owned by Community Newspaper Holdings Inc., a company founded in 1997 by Ralph Martin. CNHI newspapers cross-sell advertising packages and shares some editorial content through the CNHI News Service.

References

External links
 The Express-Star website
 CNHI website

Newspapers published in Oklahoma
Grady County, Oklahoma